Jo Hamilton (1827–1904) was a California lawyer and politician who served as Attorney General of California from 1867 to 1871 and again from 1875 to 1880. He also served as Trustee of the State Library, 1874–82. He was a pioneer lawyer of Placer County, California where he served as District Attorney in 1860 and again 1862 and he was also listed as a leading Democrat of California and was one of the best known lawyers of his time. After retiring, he continued to practice law in Auburn, Placer County.

References

External links
Brief biography with picture

1827 births
1904 deaths
California Attorneys General
People from Auburn, California